is a passenger railway station in the city of Kisarazu, Chiba Prefecture, Japan, operated by the East Japan Railway Company (JR East).

Lines
Makuta Station is a station on the Kururi Line, and is located 13.9 km from the terminus of the line at Kisarazu Station.

Station layout
The station consists of a single side platform serving bidirectional traffic. The platform is short, and can only handle trains with a length of five carriages or less. The station formerly had two opposed side platforms; however, one platform is no longer in operation. The station is staffed.

Platform

History
Makuta Station was opened on December 28, 1912 as a station on the Chiba Prefectural Railways Kururi Line. The line was nationalized into the Japanese Government Railways (JGR) on September 1, 1923. The JGR became the Japan National Railways (JNR) after World War II. The station was absorbed into the JR East network upon the privatization of the JNR on April 1, 1987.

Passenger statistics
In fiscal 2019, the station was used by an average of 191 passengers daily (boarding passengers only).

Surrounding area
 
 Kisarazu City Hall Tomikuda Branch Office
 Fukuta Community Center

See also
 List of railway stations in Japan

References

External links

  JR East Station information

Kururi Line
Stations of East Japan Railway Company
Railway stations in Chiba Prefecture
Railway stations in Japan opened in 1912
Kisarazu